

Welsh Football League Division Two 

This league known as the Nathanielcars.co.uk Welsh League Division Two for sponsorship reasons, is a football league in Wales. This is the second division of football in South Wales and the third tier of the Welsh Football League.

The reigning champions are Goytre.

Promotion and relegation 

Teams promoted from 2012–13 Welsh Football League Division Three
 Chepstow Town - Champions
 Cardiff Corinthians - 2nd Position

Teams relegated from 2012–13 Welsh Football League Division One
 Caerleon - 16th Position

Stadia and locations

League table

Notes

References 
http://www.welshleague.org.uk/index.htm
http://www.welshleague.org.uk/results.htm

Welsh Football League Division Two seasons
3
Wales